Ephedranthus is a genus of flowering plants belonging to the family Annonaceae.

Its native range is Southern Tropical America.

Species:

Ephedranthus amazonicus 
Ephedranthus boliviensis 
Ephedranthus columbianus 
Ephedranthus dimerus 
Ephedranthus guianensis 
Ephedranthus parviflorus 
Ephedranthus pisocarpus

References

Annonaceae
Annonaceae genera